Westerlund 1-237 or Wd 1-237 is a possible red supergiant (RSG) in the constellation of Ara. It is one out of four known red supergiants in the Westerlund 1 super star cluster, although its outlying position, spectrum, and parallax, suggest it could be a foreground giant. As a red supergiant, it would be one of the largest known stars and one of the most luminous of its type.

Physical characteristics 

Westerlund 1-237 is classified as a luminous cool supergiant emitting most of its energy in the infrared spectrum. It is surrounded by a radio nebula which is similar in mass to those of Westerlund 1-20 and Westerlund 1 W26, and moreover directly comparable to that of VY Canis Majoris. The elliptical structure of this nebula however indicates that it has been less affected by the cluster wind of Westerlund 1 (W20 and W26 have pronounced cometary shaped nebulae). The outflow velocity for the RSG wind is assumed to be around 30 km/s.

The star occupies the upper right corner of the Hertzsprung-Russell diagram.

Distance 

In 2020, the parallax was revised to the much smaller value of 0.3370 mas.

See also 
 Westerlund 1-75

References 

Ara (constellation)
M-type supergiants
M-type giants
J16470309-4552189